Thersites is a genus of large, air-breathing land snails, terrestrial pulmonate gastropod molluscs in the family Camaenidae.

Species
Species within the genus Thersites include:
 Thersites darlingtoni Clench & Archer, 1938
 Thersites mitchellae  Cox, 1864 
 Thersites novaehollandiae Gray, 1834
 Thersites richmondiana  Reeve, 1852

References

Camaenidae